Beaches in the Indian state of Kerala are spread along the 550-km Arabian Sea coastline. Kerala is an Indian state occupying the south-west corner of the subcontinent. The topography of the coastline is distinctive and changes abruptly as one proceeds from north to south. In the northern parts of Kerala, in places such as Bekal, Thalassery and Kannur, the headlands rise above the shore from the fringe of the beaches. The highlands are dotted with forts built by the colonial powers – the Portuguese, the Dutch and the British. The view of the surrounding area is mesmerizing. From Kozhikode, once the hub of the Malabar coast, the view changes to flat lands with rocky outcroppings jutting out. One feature is common all through – the coconut tree in large numbers. Dense groves of coconut trees line the coast and extend to the interiors.

Tourism

 

The long coastline of Kerala is inextricably entwined with the culture, life and traditions of the state. Memories of early seafarers and traders have faded, but boats of various types and styles have survived. Kerala's beaches, or Kovalam to be more specific, were rediscovered by back-packers and tan-seekers in the sixties. Hordes of hippies followed in the seventies. That started the transformation of the casual fishing village into a busy tourist destination. In 2002, there were 66 hotels in Kovalam, and that too in a place that is just 16 km from the state capital Thiruvananthapuram.

From a measly 29,000 overseas tourists visiting Kerala in 1979, the number rose to 225,000 in 2000 and the number of tourists is growing rapidly. Foreign tourist arrivals in Kerala in 2006 was 428,534, an increase of 23.68% over the previous year. Domestic tourist arrivals were 6,271,724, an increase of 5.47% over the previous year. The ABC of Kerala tourism is ayurveda, beaches, (backwater) canals.

While details of incoming tourists are not available, indications of a survey are that domestic tourists are high from Gujarat and Maharashtra both located on the west coast of India, and international tourists are mostly from Europe. Beaches were amongst the favourite destination of foreign tourists.

Lying between north latitudes 8°18' and 12°48' . Kerala is well within the humid equatorial tropics. The mean annual temperature ranges from 25.0 to 27.5 °C in the coastal lowlands. With 120–140 rainy days per year, Kerala is also influenced by the seasonal heavy rains of the southwest summer monsoon.

Tsunami
Tsunami waves diffracted around the Indian peninsula, hitting Kerala on the west coast on the afternoon of 26 December 2004. The death toll in Kerala was 170 against 7,923 in neighbouring Tamil Nadu. However, there was panic all around. In the Thiruvananthapuram area alone, 100,000 people were evacuated from coastal villages by the district administration and 57 relief camps were opened.

Trinkets

The fun of sea and sun bathing or watching the wave crash are not the only attractions of beaches. There is a belief that a dip in waters of Papanasam Beach at Varkala, of Trivandrum district, 40 km north of Trivandrum city, washes away sins (papam). Priests from the 2,000-year-old Janardhana temple are there to assist believers to perform the rituals. The main bell of the temple was presented by the Dutch captain of a sailing ship in the 17th century. Comparatively lower hotel tariffs and cheap food draw in European backpackers and domestic tourists with lower budget to the place.

The Portuguese explorer Vasco Da Gama landed at Kappkadavu (Kappad), a small coastal village in the Kozhikode district, on 27 May 1498, thereby marking the opening of a sea route from Europe to India. A plaque on the beach commemorates the arrival. Kozhikode was earlier visited by Marco Polo (1254-1324) and Ibn Battuta (1304-1368 or 1377).

There is a Hindu burial ground near Payyambalam Beach, 2 km from Kannur town. The remains of Communist leaders such as A. K. Gopalan and E. K. Nayanar are interred there.

Popular beaches in Kerala
Mentioned below are some of the most popular beaches in Kerala.

Alappuzha Beach
Thumpoly Beach 
Bekal
Ponnani
Tanur
Kadalundi
Chavakkad Beach
Cherai Beach
Kappad
Kozhikode Beach
Kappkadavu
Kollam Beach
Kovalam
Marari Beach
Thumpoly Beach 
Meenkunnu Beach
Munakkal Beach         
Mundakkal Beach
Muzhappilangad Beach
Thekkumbhagam-Kappil Beach
Payyambalam Beach
Shankumugham Beach
Snehatheeram Beach
Thirumullavaram Beach
Varkala Beach
Somatheeram Beach
Kannur Beach
Payyoli Beach

Development
The total revenue created by tourism in 2006 was Rs. 912.6 billion. This has in turn inspired the Government to spend more on tourism. The beaches of Kerala are ready to look prettier, with the Kerala Tourism launching a Rs. 1,000 million plan for the development of 22 beaches, including Kovalam, Alappuzha, Nattika, Cherai, Muzhappilangad, Bekal and Kappad. The beach conservation and development works will be completed by the 2008 year-end tourism season.

References

Sources
 
 

Lists of beaches in India